Mark Breeze (real name Mark Brady, born 1970), also known as DJ Breeze, is a British DJ and producer of UK hardcore music. He is best known for his collaborations with Darren Styles as Styles & Breeze and the compilation mix series Clubland X-Treme Hardcore. He is also the founder of the label Infinity Recordings, running it from 1997 to 2003, when DJ Silver took over its operations.

Discography

Singles
 "Let Me Fly" (2003) - UK #59
 "You're Shining" (2004) - UK #19
 "Heartbeatz" (2005) - UK #16

References

External links 
DJ Breeze on Discogs
Mark Breeze on Discogs
Styles & Breeze on Discogs
DJ Breeze Home Page
Mark Breeze on Myspace

English DJs
English record producers
English songwriters
Living people
Happy hardcore musicians
1970 births
UK hardcore musicians
Musicians from London
Electronic dance music DJs